Het Grote Songfestivalfeest is a Dutch television concert programme starring artists of the Eurovision Song Contest, produced by PilotStudio in collaboration with the Dutch broadcaster AVROTROS and held at the Ziggo Dome in Amsterdam. Two editions of the show have been held, on 15 December 2019 and 17 November 2022 respectively, with a third set to take place on 16 November 2023.

The first edition of Het Grote Songfestivalfeest was broadcast in the Netherlands on 1 January 2020 as a pre-event prior to the Eurovision Song Contest 2020, which was to be held in Rotterdam prior to its cancellation. The second edition was broadcast in the United Kingdom on 1 January 2023 as a pre-event prior to the Eurovision Song Contest 2023 in Liverpool, followed by the Netherlands on 4 January.

Presenters
The first edition of the show in 2019 was originally planned to be hosted by Dutch Eurovision commentators Cornald Maas and Jan Smit, however the latter had to withdraw due to illness and was later replaced by one of his Eurovision 2020 co-hosts, Edsilia Rombley. Rombley, who represented the Netherlands in the 1998 and 2007 contests, also performed her entries during the concert. Former Dutch spokespersons Emma Wortelboer and Tim Douwsma, as well as Junior Eurovision Song Contest commentator , also appeared as presenters during the show to introduce some of the acts. Maas and Rombley returned as hosts for the second edition in 2022. The highlights from the 2022 show were additionally broadcast in the United Kingdom on BBC One with segments hosted by Rylan.

Performances

2019 edition 
Thirty-one Eurovision acts from seventeen countries participated in the first edition of the concert.

Key

Withdrawn artists 
The original list of the performers also included Willeke Alberti, the Dutch representative at the Eurovision Song Contest 1994, who missed the show due to illness. 's Lordi and 's Dima Bilan, who won the contest in 2006 and 2008 respectively, were expected to perform, but they later withdrew their participation. Helena Paparizou was also invited, but couldn't participate in person due to a scheduling clash with a live broadcast of The Voice of Greece. Instead, she sent a video message in which she sang the refrain of her 2005 winning song "My Number One".

2022 edition 
Thirty-one Eurovision acts from sixteen countries participated in the second edition of the concert.

Key

Withdrawn artists 
Prior to its postponement from the original December 2021 date, the initial list of performers for the second edition included Brotherhood of Man, the British winners of the Eurovision Song Contest 1976; Bobbysocks!, the Norwegian winners of the Eurovision Song Contest 1985; Sertab Erener, the Turkish winner of the Eurovision Song Contest 2003; Eleni Foureira, the Cypriot runner-up of the Eurovision Song Contest 2018; Kristian Kostov, the Bulgarian runner-up of the Eurovision Song Contest 2017; Marija Šerifović, the Serbian winner of the Eurovision Song Contest 2007; and Verka Serduchka, the Ukrainian runner-up of the Eurovision Song Contest 2007. 

Sam Ryder, the British runner-up of the Eurovision Song Contest 2022, was also due to appear, but later withdrew his participation due to other obligations.

Appearances

Multiple artist appearances

Broadcasting
In the Netherlands, Het Grote Songfestivalfeest aired on 1 January 2020 on NPO 3 at 20:25 and on BVN at 21:40 (CET). The concert was later broadcast in Greece on ERT1. The first part aired on 29 February, with the second following the next day. The concert also aired in Australia on 10 May at 20:30 (AEST) on SBS Viceland. The concert was known as The Road to Eurovision 2020: The Winners and was part of an alternate Australian Eurovision broadcast that took place from 10–17 May 2020 due to the cancellation of the Eurovision Song Contest 2020.

In the United Kingdom, a cut of the second edition were broadcast on BBC One as The Big Eurovision Party on 1 January 2023, which also acted as a pre-event prior to the Eurovision Song Contest 2023 in Liverpool. The British coverage was presented by Rylan, who recorded additional links and short interviews backstage for the BBC One broadcast. A different cut of the show was broadcast in the Netherlands on 4 January at 21:15 (CET) on NPO 3.

Gallery

See also
 Songs of Europe
 Congratulations: 50 Years of the Eurovision Song Contest
 Eurovision Song Contest's Greatest Hits

Notes

References

External links

 
 Het Grote Songfestivalfeest 2019 on setlist.fm
 Het Grote Songfestivalfeest 2022 on setlist.fm

2020 in Dutch television
2023 in Dutch television
2020 television specials
2023 television specials
Music television specials
Nostalgia television shows
2019 in the Netherlands
2022 in the Netherlands
2019 concerts
2022 concerts
2019 in music
2022 in music
2010s in Amsterdam
2020s in Amsterdam
December 2019 events in the Netherlands
November 2022 events in the Netherlands
Events in Amsterdam
Eurovision Song Contest 2020
Television shows about the Eurovision Song Contest
NPO 3 original programming